Baharestan (also Romanized as Bahārestān) is a village in Vahdat Rural District, in the Central District of Zarand County, Kerman Province, Iran. At the 2006 census, its population was 81, in 19 families.

References 

Populated places in Zarand County